The Acom International was a professional golf tournament that was held in Japan from 1990 to 2006. Sposored by Acom, it was an event on the Japan Golf Tour, and used a modified Stableford scoring system until 1999, when it became a standard stroke play event. The purse for the final event in 2006 was ¥120,000,000, with ¥24,000,000 going to the winner.

From 1983 to 1989, Acom sponsored a pairs better ball tournament, the Acom Doubles.

Tournament hosts

Winners

Notes

References

External links
Coverage on Japan Golf Tour's official site

Former Japan Golf Tour events
Defunct golf tournaments in Japan
Recurring sporting events established in 1983
Recurring sporting events disestablished in 2006